This is a list of world records for Masters age groups in the sport of road running.  The world governing body for masters athletics is World Masters Athletics (WMA).  WMA conducts various world championships in what are called "non stadia" events, meaning races not held in the confines of a stadium.  But with the exception of the marathon and three race walking events, WMA does not publish world records in other common road racing distances.  These records are kept instead by the Association of Road Racing Statisticians (ARRS).  In the case of the marathon, these two organizations agree on many records, but in the age groups where they disagree, the WMA ratified record is highlighted in yellow.

Men

5K run

8K run

10K run

12K run

15K run

20K run

Half Marathon

Marathon

Women

5K run

8K run

10K run

12K run

15K run

20K run

Half Marathon

Marathon

References
General
WMA records non stadia – Men 2 January 2023 updated
WMA records non stadia – Women 2 January 2023 updated
Specific

External links
World Masters Athletics - Records

World records in athletics
World road running